Raymond Thomas (born 27 October 1968) is a Jamaican former cyclist. He first competed in the road race at the 1988 Summer Olympics in Seoul.

References

External links
 

1968 births
Living people
Jamaican male cyclists
Olympic cyclists of Jamaica
Cyclists at the 1988 Summer Olympics
Place of birth missing (living people)